Crionica is a genus of moths of the family Erebidae. The genus was erected by George Hampson in 1926.

Species
Crionica bifurcata Gaede, 1939
Crionica cervicornis Fawcett, 1917
Crionica diversipennis Gaede, 1939
Crionica incurvata Gaede, 1939

References

Calpinae